Knights and Magick is a line of miniatures published by Heritage.

Contents
Knights and Magick is ax extensive fantasy line consisting of packs of one to six 22mm fantasy figures, both general army types, and specific creatures and character types described in the Knights and Magick rules.

Reception
Spalding Boldrick reviewed the Knights and Magick miniatures in The Space Gamer No. 42. Boldrick commented that "Unless you are looking for figures specifically for a Knights and Magick game, there are better figure lines available. Only those figure types not covered by other lines are really worth acquiring."

References

See also
List of lines of miniatures

Miniature figures